Mangane is a surname. Notable people with the surname include:

Kader Mangane (born 1983), Senegalese footballer
Mame Birame Mangane (born 1969), Senegalese footballer
Moktar Mangane (born 1982), Senegalese footballer

Senegalese surnames